Hillsboro Municipal Airport  is six miles north of City of Hillsboro, in Hill County, Texas.

Most U.S. airports use the same three-letter location identifier for the FAA and IATA, but this airport is INJ to the FAA and has no IATA code. (IATA says INJ is Injune, Queensland, Australia).

Facilities
It has one asphalt runway, 16/34, 3,998 by 60 feet (1,219 x 18 m). In the year ending August 7, 2008 the airport had 6,000 general aviation aircraft operations, average 16 per day.

References

External links 
 Hillsboro Municipal Airport at City of Hillsboro website
 Aerial photo as of 19 January 1995 from USGS The National Map
 

Airports in Texas
Buildings and structures in Hill County, Texas
Transportation in Hill County, Texas